A seam is an obsolete unit of volume or mass in the United Kingdom

The Oxford English Dictionary includes definitions of a seam as:

  of sand
  of apples
  of grain

References

External links
 A collection of further definitions and quotations

Units of volume
Units of mass
Customary units of measurement